The memorial for the victims of war stands at the mass grave for the Jews who were shot in Novohrad-Volynskyi in the Second World War that began in September 1939 . The monument was created by the artist Josef Tabachnyk who makes monuments and sculptures.

It lies near the House of the Officers in Novohrad-Volynskyi, where women and children were murdered in the Second World War. In pink granite, a mother is depicted carrying her tortured children in her arms. Two stone pyramids connected to one another form a Star of David, on which the inscription "We remember" is written in Hebrew. The black pyramid symbolises a body, which is aiming for the ground. The pink pyramid symbolises a soul, which is ready to rise up to heaven.

The sculpture was opened in 1995. The sculpture's measurements are 200 x 200 x 200 cm.

References 

World War II memorials in Ukraine
Holocaust memorials
Monuments and memorials in Ukraine